Strobl is a surname. Notable people with the surname include:

Alajos Stróbl (1856–1926), Hungarian sculptor and artist
Chris Strobl (born 1987), German hacker
Claudia Strobl (born 1965), Austrian skier
Fritz Strobl (born 1972), Austrian skier
Gabriel Strobl (1846–1925), Austrian priest and entomologist
Heinz Strobl, Austrian musician
Josef Strobl (born 1974), Austrian skier
Karl Hans Strobl (1877–1946), Austrian novelist
Michael Strobl (born 1977), American military officer
Roman Strobl (born 1951), Austrian sculptor
Thomas Strobl, German politician, chairman of CDU Baden-Württemberg
Tobias Strobl (born 1990), German footballer
Tony Strobl (1915–1991), American comics artist and animator
Zsigmond Kisfaludi Strobl (1884–1975), Hungarian sculptor

German-language surnames